William John Arthur Charles James Cavendish-Bentinck, 6th Duke of Portland,  (28 December 1857 – 26 April 1943), known as William Cavendish-Bentinck until 1879, was a British landowner, courtier, and Conservative politician. He notably served as Master of the Horse between 1886 and 1892 and again between 1895 and 1905.

Background and education
Portland was the son of Lieutenant-General Arthur Cavendish-Bentinck by his first wife Elizabeth Sophia Hawkins-Whitshed, daughter of Sir St Vincent Hawkins-Whitshed, 2nd Baronet and granddaughter of Admiral Sir James Hawkins-Whitshed, 1st Baronet. His paternal grandparents were Lord Charles Bentinck and his second wife Anne Wellesley, the natural daughter of Richard Wellesley, 1st Marquess Wellesley, and a niece of Arthur Wellesley, 1st Duke of Wellington. Lord Charles was the third son of Prime Minister William Cavendish-Bentinck, 3rd Duke of Portland by his wife Lady Dorothy Cavendish, daughter of William Cavendish, 4th Duke of Devonshire. Portland's mother died only a few days after his birth. He was educated at Eton. He inherited the Cavendish-Bentinck estates, based around Welbeck Abbey in Nottinghamshire, from his cousin William Cavendish-Scott-Bentinck, 5th Duke of Portland, in 1879. He also succeeded his stepmother as second Baron Bolsover in 1893. His half-sister Lady Ottoline Morrell was a society hostess and patron of the arts associated with the Bloomsbury Group.

Public life
Portland initially embarked on a military career and served as a lieutenant in the Coldstream Guards from 1877 to 1880, and then as lieutenant-colonel of the part-time Honourable Artillery Company from 1881 to 1889.  He was honorary colonel of the 1st Lanarkshire Artillery Volunteers from 1884 to 1891, and of the 4th (Militia) Battalion of The Sherwood Foresters from 1889, and of the latter regiment's 7th (Robin Hood) Battalion (Volunteers, later Territorial Force) from 1898.

He sat on the Conservative benches in the House of Lords and held office as Master of the Horse under Lord Salisbury from 1886 to 1892 and from 1895 to 1902 and under Arthur Balfour from 1902 to 1905. In 1886, he was sworn of the Privy Council.

He was made a Knight Grand Cross of the Royal Victorian Order (GCVO) in 1896, and was a holder of the Royal Victorian Chain. In 1900 he was appointed a Knight of the Garter, receiving the insignia in an investiture by Queen Victoria at Windsor Castle on 16 March 1900. He was appointed a Knight of Justice of the Order of the Hospital of St. John of Jerusalem in England (KStJ) in July 1901. He also held the Grand Cross of the Order of Charles III (Spain), 1st Class Order of St Sava (Serbia) the Grand Cordon of the Order of the Crown (Belgium), and the Grand Cross of the Order of St Stephen (Austria-Hungary).

The Portlands visited British India to attend the 1903 Delhi Durbar held in January 1903 to celebrated the succession of King Edward VII as Emperor of India.

He was Lord-Lieutenant of Caithness from 1889 to 1919, Lord Lieutenant of Nottinghamshire from 1898 to 1939, a Deputy Lieutenant of Ayrshire, and a trustee of the British Museum.

The Portlands received Archduke Franz Ferdinand of Austria at Welbeck Abbey for a week in 1913 when the heir to the Austro-Hungarian throne visited England.  During the stay he took the Archduke shooting on the estate when, according to Portland's memoirs, Men, Women and Things:

From 1937 to 1943 he was Chancellor of the Order of the Garter. At the coronation of King George VI Portland carried the crown of Queen Elizabeth, whose mother (the Countess of Strathmore and Kinghorne) was his cousin. It was at his estate in Langwell that the Sunderland Flying boat carrying the Duke of Kent (the King's youngest brother) crashed while en route to a RAF Base in Iceland.

Benefaction and legacies
The Duke and Duchess of Portland were custodians and collectors of fine art. They were respectful and generous to the hundreds of staff they employed. One former servant, George Slingsby, who was employed as a footman at Welbeck Abbey before the First World War, wrote that "most of their staff had a job for life, were well cared for in the estate’s own hospital block when they were ill, and at such times nothing was deducted from their wages, at a time when the working classes had no privileges, or indeed any help from the Government."

Thoroughbred horse racing
Portland inherited the estate and stud farm near Clumber Park in North Nottinghamshire. Among the horses he owned was St. Simon, who won the 1884 Ascot Gold Cup. He also bred and owned Ayrshire and Donovan, who won the 1888 and 1889 runnings of The Derby.

Family

Portland married Winifred Anna Dallas-Yorke, daughter of Thomas Dallas-Yorke, DL, JP, of Walmsgate, Lincolnshire, on 11 June 1889. They had three children:

 Lady Victoria Alexandrina Violet Cavendish-Bentinck (born 27 February 1890, died 8 May 1994), married Captain Michael Erskine-Wemyss and had issue. She was the last surviving godchild of Queen Victoria.
 William Arthur Henry Cavendish-Bentinck, 7th Duke of Portland (born 16 March 1893, died 21 March 1977)
 Lord (Francis) Morven Dallas Cavendish-Bentinck (born 27 July 1900, died 22 August 1950), died unmarried.

Portland died in April 1943, aged 85, and was interred at the traditional burial place of the Dukes of Portland in the churchyard of St Winifred's Church at Holbeck.
He was succeeded by his eldest son, William. The Duchess of Portland died in July 1954, aged 90. The department of Manuscripts and Special Collections, The University of Nottingham holds estate papers of the 6th Duke in the Portland (London) Collection (Pl).

Ancestry

Arms

Publications
Portland was author of the following memoirs:

Fifty Years and More of Sport in Scotland (1933)
Memories of Racing and Hunting (1935)
Men, Women and Things (1937)

References

External links 

1857 births
1943 deaths
People educated at Eton College
William, 6th Duke of Portland
106
British racehorse owners and breeders
Owners of Epsom Derby winners
Lord-Lieutenants of Caithness
Lord-Lieutenants of Nottinghamshire
Deputy Lieutenants of Ayrshire
Knights of the Garter
Knights Grand Cross of the Royal Victorian Order
Bailiffs Grand Cross of the Order of St John
Grand Crosses of the Order of Saint Stephen of Hungary
Recipients of the Order of St. Sava
People from Welbeck
Place of birth missing
Place of death missing
Chancellors of the Order of the Garter
British landowners
Members of the Privy Council of the United Kingdom